The 1999 CONCACAF U-17 Tournament was played in Jamaica and El Salvador. The qualification for the 1999 CONCACAF U-17 Tournament took place between September and December 1998.

Qualifying

Caribbean Zone

First round

|}

Second round

|}

Third round

Central American Zone

First round

|}

Second round

|}

Final tournament

Qualified teams

Group stage

Group A

Group B

Playoff

|}

 USA qualified to the 1999 FIFA U-17 World Championship in New Zealand.

References

1999
Under
1999
1999
1998–99 in Salvadoran football
1998–99 in Jamaican football
1998–99 in Mexican football
1998–99 in Honduran football
1998–99 in Costa Rican football
1999 in American soccer
1999 in Canadian soccer
1999 in youth association football